The Most Illustrious Order of the Crown of Selangor (Bahasa Melayu: Darjah Kebesaran Mahkota Selangor Yang Amat Mulia) is an order awarded by Sultan of Selangor as a reward for general services to the sultan and state of Selangor. It was founded in 1961. The order is awarded to the relatives of the Sultan of Selangor as well as high-ranking individuals who have contributed excellence to the Sultan of Selangor and the Sultan's Government. The Sultan also has the right to bestow this Degree of Excellence to anyone whom he deems fit and appropriate to receive it.

Classes 
The four classes of appointment to the Order are, in descending order of precedence:
Knight Grand Commander or Seri Paduka Mahkota Selangor (SPMS)
Knight Commander or Dato Paduka Mahkota Selangor (DPMS)
Companion or Setia Mahkota Selangor (SMS)
Member or Ahli Mahkota Selangor (AMS)

Seri Paduka Mahkota Selangor (SPMS) can only be awarded to two people at one time and the maximum number of recipients is 40 people. 
Dato Paduka Mahkota Selangor (DPMS) can be awarded up to 20 people at one time and the maximum number of recipients is 600 people.

Styles 
Male recipients of Seri Paduka Mahkota Selangor (SPMS) will carry the title Dato' Seri and their female spouse Datin Seri. Female recipients of the order will carry the title Datin Paduka Seri. Husband to the female recipients will not carry any title. The title Dato' Seri is a new title that has been approved in a State Executive Council meeting dated 23 December 1998 on the consent of the Sultan of Selangor. Previously, male recipients use the title Dato' and his spouse Datin, while Datin Paduka is the title given to female recipients. 
Male recipients of Dato Paduka Mahkota Selangor (DPMS) will carry the title Dato' and their female spouse Datin. Female recipients of the order will carry the title Datin Paduka. Husbands of female recipients will not carry any title.

Recipients of Setia Mahkota Selangor (SMS) and Ahli Mahkota Selangor (AMS) will not carry any title.

Appearance

Knight Grand Commander 
It is awarded in a set of breast star, a collar, a badge and a red coloured sash with a yellow stripe, worn from right shoulder to the left waist.

The collar is made of silver-plated metal and enamel. It is worn on the same length at the front and back. For male recipients, the collar is 100.6 cm long while it is 78.74 cm for female recipients. The differences is because the female's collar is designed to be worn at the neck so it is made without the two chain link in the middle of the male's collar. This necklace has 14 connecting chain link for male, and 12 for female. The two middle chains contain two frames of the Selangor flag that are combined with crescent moon and star. To his left and right are two rubber leaves compositions. All these compositions are made of enamel.

The rest of the chain links are round in shape and adorned with coconut leaves around them. These compositions are arranged into four pairs, each of which contains three different types of chromatic compositions, the first containing the word Selangor in jawi, the second contains two crossed fragments of coconut leaves, and the third contains crescent and stars. Each of these compositions is made of  shadowed thin, red enamel metal.

The breast star is made of silver-plated metal, its surface length is 6.985 cm long and has five arise fractions, complete with circles at the end of each of these fractions, and made of red enamel metal. In the center of this star is a circle of 3.175 cm long bearing the symbol of Selangor state with yellow enamel as the base.

The badge is made of silver-plated metal. It is five pointed and decorated just like the breast star. It is also decorated with the engraving of the Selangor State Emblem on red enamel. This badge is made to be suspended on the collar or sash.

The sash is made of red silk cloth 10.16 cm in width for male, 5.715 cm for female, with a 2.54 cm wide yellow band in the center.

Knight Commander 
It is awarded in a set of breast star, a badge and a red coloured sash with a yellow stripe, worn from right shoulder to the left waist.

The shape and size of the badge is the same as the Knight Grand Commander's except the symbols are shown on a flat background, replacing the engraved emblem in the red enamel background in the former. The breast star is also of the same size and shape as Knight Grand Commander's but without the five-pointed silver star.

The male sash is made of 10 cm wide red silk cloth with a 2 cm wide yellow band in the middle. To the left and right of the band are two 0.35 cm wide red strips and two 0.35 cm wide yellow strips. The female sash is 5.7 cm in width with a 1.14 cm wide yellow band in its center. Similar to the male sash, it has two red strips and two yellow strips, both are 0.19 cm wide to the right of the yellow band in the middle of the sash.

The sash was included in the award from 25 February 1999.

Notable recipients 
 Abdul Razak Hussein (SPMS, 1965)
 Omar Ong Yoke Lin (SPMS, 1973)
 Mahathir Mohamad (SPMS, 1978, returned 11 December 2017)
 Tengku Razaleigh Hamzah (SPMS, 1982)
 Musa Hitam (SPMS, 1982)
 Tan Siew Sin (SPMS, 1985)
  Ruby Lee, former Secretary General of the Malaysian Red Crescent Society (SPMS, 1985) 
 Hamzah Abu Samah (SPMS, 1987)
 Endon Mahmood (SPMS, 10 April 2003)
 Ahmad Fairuz Abdul Halim (SPMS, 2 December 2004)
 Rosmah Mansor (SPMS, 2005, suspended 6 May 2019, revoked 12 September 2022)
 Tengku Amir Shah (SPMS, 2005)
 Najib Razak (SPMS, 16 March 2006, suspended 6 May 2019, revoked 12 September 2022)
 Musa Hassan (SPMS, 11 January 2007)
 Khir Toyo (SPMS, 22 November 2007, revoked 30 September 2015)
 Jeanne Abdullah (SPMS, 20 December 2007)
 Abdullah Ahmad Badawi (SPMS, 27 April 2000)
 Arifin Zakaria (SPMS, 11 December 2012)
 Ali Hamsa (SPMS, 11 December 2013)
 Azmin Ali (SPMS, 2015)
 Amirudin Shari (SPMS, 11 December 2019)
 Arshad Ayub (SPMS, 2009)
 Noor Hisham Abdullah (SPMS, 11 December 2020)

See also 
Orders, decorations, and medals of the Malaysian states and federal territories#Selangor
Orders, decorations, and medals of Selangor
List of post-nominal letters (Selangor)

References 

Orders of chivalry of Malaysia
Orders, decorations, and medals of Selangor
Selangor